The 2012 California State Senate election was held on November 6, 2012, with the primary election on June 5, 2012. Voters in the 20 odd-numbered districts of the California State Senate voted for their representatives. Other elections were also held on November 6.

Overview 

† The 4th district, which was not up for election in this cycle, was vacant due to the resignation of Republican Doug LaMalfa.

Results

District 1

District 3

District 5

District 7

District 9

District 11

District 13

District 15

District 17

District 19

District 21

District 23

District 25

District 27

District 29

District 31

District 33

District 35

District 37

District 39

References 

State Senate
California State Senate elections
California State Senate